Rene Gutdeutsch (born 20 March 1981) is an Austrian former para table tennis player who competed at international elite competitions. He is a Paralympic silver medalist and a European champion in team events alongside Stanislaw Fraczyk. He was born with a shortened right leg.

References

1981 births
Living people
Paralympic table tennis players of Austria
Austrian male table tennis players
Table tennis players at the 2004 Summer Paralympics
Medalists at the 2004 Summer Paralympics